Esens may signify:

Places
 Esens, Lower Saxony, a municipality in Lower Saxony, Germany
 Esens (Samtgemeinde), a "collective municipality" in Lower Saxony, Germany

People
 Hero Oomkens von Esens, a Frisian nobleman (c. 1455 – 1522)
 Balthasar Oomkens von Esens, was a Frisian nobleman (died 1540)
 Chief Esens or Thomas Little Shell, an Ojibwa chief (-1901)
 Tevfik Esenç, the last known speaker of the Ubykh language (1904–1992)

See also 
 Esen (disambiguation)